The Huetstock (also known as Wild Geissberg) is a mountain of the Urner Alps, located on the border between Nidwalden and Obwalden in Central Switzerland. It is located between the valleys of Melchtal and Engelberg, just north of the Rotsandnollen.

References

External links
 Huetstock on Hikr

Mountains of the Alps
Mountains of Switzerland
Mountains of Obwalden
Mountains of Nidwalden
Nidwalden–Obwalden border
Two-thousanders of Switzerland
Kerns, Switzerland